Davros is a Big Finish Productions audio drama based on the long-running British science fiction television series Doctor Who.

Plot
When Davros is revived and asked by the head of an Earth corporation to use his great genius to work for good ends, the Kaled scientist seems to be playing along. The Sixth Doctor arrives and insists that Davros cannot be trusted, that he is "one of – no, actually, the most evil being this galaxy has ever produced!" Forced however to work alongside his nemesis, on projects such as famine relief, the Doctor seeks to uncover Davros before he can put new schemes to create a powerbase into effect.

Cast
The Doctor — Colin Baker
Davros — Terry Molloy
Scientist Ral — David Bickerstaff
Willis — Eddie de Oliveira
Kaled Medics — Louise Faulkner and Karl Hansen
Arnold Baynes — Bernard Horsfall
Shan — Katarina Olsson
Lorraine Baynes — Wendy Padbury
Kimberley Todd — Ruth Sillers
Pilot — Andrew Westfield

See also
Davros — the character
Television serials featuring Davros:
Genesis of the Daleks
Destiny of the Daleks
Resurrection of the Daleks
Revelation of the Daleks
Remembrance of the Daleks
"The Stolen Earth"/"Journey's End"
"The Magician's Apprentice"/"The Witch's Familiar"

Notes
This story is part of a trilogy with Omega and Master to celebrate the 40th anniversary of Doctor Who. The plot concerns the Sixth Doctor's attempts to determine whether Davros is sincerely helping an Earth corporation benevolently, or if he is up to more dangerous schemes.
The story marks the first appearance of Davros in the Big Finish audios. Following his first appearance in Genesis of the Daleks, he appeared in every subsequent Dalek story in the original television series, but Big Finish initially declined to use him in any of their audio Dalek stories.
The Daleks do not appear in this story.
For Davros, this audio adventure takes place between the events of Resurrection of the Daleks and Revelation of the Daleks, making this his first of many encounters with the Sixth Doctor.
Peri is mentioned as travelling with the Sixth Doctor although she is absent from this story, "safely on the other side of the galaxy attending a botany symposium".
Wendy Padbury played former companion Zoe Heriot alongside Patrick Troughton's Second Doctor from The Wheel in Space to The War Games.
Wendy Padbury reunites with Colin Baker in Legend of the Cybermen, this time playing Zoe, and accompanied by Frazer Hines as Jamie McCrimmon.
Bernard Horsfall has appeared several times in different roles in the television series. He was Gulliver in The Mind Robber, a Time Lord in The War Games, Taron in Planet of the Daleks and Chancellor Goth in The Deadly Assassin.
This story influenced the production of the four part Big Finish series I, Davros.  In particular the third instalment, Corruption features specific elements of this play, including Shan.
Chronologically, this is the earliest audio drama to feature the Sixth Doctor.
An extract from this audio play can be heard on Colin Baker's official website.
To date, this is the first and only appearance of Davros without the Daleks.
The plot point of Davros being given the opportunity to commit suicide shortly after the attack which left him crippled originally appeared in the 1990 novelisation of Remembrance of the Daleks, written by Ben Aaronovitch.

External links
Big Finish Productions - Davros
Watch interview with Terry Molloy discussing I Davros

2003 audio plays
Sixth Doctor audio plays
Davros audio plays